Klimovo is a rural locality (a village) in Gorodetskoye Rural Settlement, Kichmengsko-Gorodetsky District, Vologda Oblast, Russia. The population was 14 as of 2002.

Geography 
Klimovo is located 34 km northwest of Kichmengsky Gorodok (the district's administrative centre) by road. Glebovo is the nearest rural locality.

References 

Rural localities in Kichmengsko-Gorodetsky District